East Cavan Gaels GAA is a Gaelic Athletic Association club located in East Cavan, Ireland. The club is primarily concerned with the game of hurling.

History

Located in the Bailieborough, Kingscourt, Shercock, Mullagh and Virginia areas in the eastern part of the county, East Cavan Gaels GAA Club was founded in 2009. Using a regional model devised by the club, it was established to promote and develop the game of hurling in an area where Gaelic football had been dominant. East Cavan Gaels currently participate in the Cavan SHC.

Honours

Cavan Under-15 Hurling League Shield (1): 2018

Notable players

 Canice Maher: All-Ireland MHC-winner (2008)

References

Gaelic games clubs in County Cavan
Hurling clubs in County Cavan